The Age of Ignorance (  /  , "ignorance") is an Islamic concept referring to the period of time and state of affairs in Arabia before the advent of Islam in 610 CE. It is often translated as the "Age of Ignorance". The term jahiliyyah is derived from the verbal root jahala "to be ignorant or stupid, to act stupidly".

In modern times various Islamic thinkers have used the term to criticize what they saw as the un-Islamic nature of public and private life in the Muslim world. For Islamist scholars like Muhammad Rashid Rida, Abul A'la Maududi, and others, Jahiliyyah refers to secular modernity and modern Western culture. In his works, Maududi asserted that modernity is the “new jahiliyyah.” Sayyid Qutb viewed jahiliyyah as a state of domination of humans over humans, as opposed to their submission to God. Radical groups have justified armed struggle against secular regimes as a jihad against jahiliyyah.

Etymology 

The term jahiliyyah is derived from the Arabic verbal root jahala "to be ignorant or stupid, to act stupidly".

Recent scholarship has begun to suggest that al-Jahiliyya (or simply Jahiliyya) did not originally express any temporal connotations but instead a state of being. It was only after several centuries following the emergence of the Quran that it began to represent a period of time preceding Muhammad's revelations.

It has been suggested that the word jahiliyyah in the Quran means "ignorant people", against both the traditional Islamic interpretation "Age of Ignorance", and the Orientalist interpretation "(state of) ignorance" (Ancient Greek ἄγνοια). The basic argument is that the ending -iyyah in early Arabic (Arabiyya) denotes a collective plural noun rather than an abstract noun, as the word jahiliyya was later understood.

In the Quran
The term Jahiliyyah is used several places in the Quran, and translations often use various terms to represent it:

Then, following misery, He sent down upon you a feeling of security, a slumber overcoming a party among you, while another party cared only for themselves, thinking false thoughts about God, thoughts fit for the Age of Idolatry. Quran 3:154
Do they truly desire the law of paganism? But who is fairer than God in judgment for a people firm of faith? Quran 5:50  
Remain in your homes, and do not display your adornments, as was the case with the earlier Age of Barbarism. Quran 33:33 
For the unbelievers had planted in their hearts a zealotry, the zealotry of lawlessness ... Quran 48:26

Historical concept

This term can be used in reference to the Arabic culture before the arrival of Islam.

Before the Islamic conversion a portion of the Arab tribes were nomadic, with a strong community spirit and some specific society rules. Their culture was patriarchal, with rudimentary religious beliefs. Although there were some traces of monotheism in the "hanifs" figures, their religious beliefs were based mostly on idol adorations and social congregations once a year around the Kaaba for trading and exchanges.
Since the term is, in its deep sense, used as a condition, and not as an historical period, the Jahiliyya is used to describe the period of ignorance and darkness that pre-dated the arrival of Islam. It refers to the general condition of those that haven't accepted the Muslim faith.

A notable usage of this concept during the Islamic Golden Age is from the 13th-century theologian Ibn Taymiyyyah (d. 1328 C.E/ 728 A.H) who pronounced Takfir (excommunication) upon the Mongol Ikhanid monarchs who had publicly professed themselves as Muslims; yet implemented a legal system which was based on Yassa code, instead of sharia (Islamic law). According to Ibn Taymiyyah, a ruler who claims to be Muslim but codifies man-made laws for governance is guilty of the pagan idolatry of Jahiliyya; in spite of his declaration of the shahada (Islamic testimony of faith), or regular observance of Salah (prayers), Sawm (fasting) and other outward expressions of religiosity. Classical Mufassir (Qur'anic commentator) Ibn Kathir ( d. 1373/ 774 A.H), a prominent pupil of Ibn Taymiyyah, propounds the same belief in his Tafsir (exegesis) of the Qur'anic verses “Whoso judgeth not according to what God hath revealed, they are the transgressors. . . . Do they therefore seek after the Jahiliyya (pre-Islamic times)?” (Surah Al-Ma'idah); writing: "[These verses] refer to people who abide by regulations and laws set by men, to fit their own misguided desires and whims, rather than adhering to the Shari'a bestowed upon us by Allah. This was the case with the inhabitants [of Arabia] during the jahiliyya . . . and (today) with the Mongols who follow the Yasa code set down by Genghis Khan, which is a conglomeration of laws, some taken from Jewish, Christian, Muslim, and other legal traditions, and many others decided upon by the whim of the Mongol rulers; the whole amalgam being given priority over the laws of Allah laid down in the Koran and the Sunna. Those who follow such (man-made) laws are infidels and should be combated until they comply with the laws of God."

Modern Jahiliyyah and Islamic revivalism

During the 1930s, militant Islamist movements began to increasingly assert that Islamic civilisation was threatened by the encroachment of Western values. At this juncture, the concept of Jahiliyya was revived by leading Islamic scholars Sayyid Rashid Rida (d.1935 C.E/ 1354 A.H) and Abul A'la Maududi (d. 1979 C.E/ 1399 A.H); both of whom equated the modern Western culture and its values with Jahiliyya. The notion was revived by prominent scholars of the twentieth century Egypt and South Asia; regions that were being impacted by increasing Westernization. These scholars saw in the doctrines of classical theologians like Ibn Taymiyya (d. 1328 C.E/ 728 A.H), Ibn Qayyim (d. 1350 C.E/ 751 A.H), Ibn Kathir (d. 1373 C.E/ 774 A.H), etc. various remedies to the influx of foreign cultural infuences.

Syrian-Egyptian Salafi theologian Rashid Rida was the first major 20th-century Islamist scholar to revive Ibn Taymiyya's ideas. He described those "geographical Muslims" who nominally adhere to Islam without disavowing the man-made laws as being upon the conditioning of Jahiliyyah. Rida asserts in Tafsir al-Manar that the Qur’ānic verse 5:44 condemning those who don't judge by Sharia (Islamic Law) refers to:".. those Muslim [rulers] who introduce novel laws today and forsake the Shari'a enjoined upon them by God. . . . They thus abolish supposedly 'distasteful’ penalties such as cutting off the hands of thieves or stoning adulterers and prostitutes. They replace them by man-made laws and penalties. He who does that has undeniably become an infidel."

Abul Ala Maududi, characterized modernity with its values, lifestyles, and political norms as the "new Jahiliyyah" which was incompatible with Islam. Such criticisms of modernity were taken up in the emerging anti-colonialist rhetoric, and the term gained currency in the Arab world through translations of Maududi's work. The concept of modern Jahiliyyah attained wide popularity through a 1950 work by Maududi's student Abul Hasan Nadvi, titled What Did the World Lose Due to the Decline of Islam? Expounding Maududi's views, Nadvi wrote that Muslims were to be held accountable for their predicament, because they came to rely on alien, un-Islamic institutions borrowed from the West.

in Egypt, Sayyid Qutb popularized the term in his influential work Ma'alim fi al-Tariq "Milestones", which included the assertion that "the Muslim community has been extinct for a few centuries."When a person embraced Islam during the time of the Prophet, he would immediately cut himself off from Jahiliyyah. When he stepped into the circle of Islam, he would start a new life, separating himself completely from his past life under ignorance of the Divine Law. He would look upon the deeds during his life of ignorance with mistrust and fear, with a feeling that these were impure and could not be tolerated in Islam! With this feeling, he would turn toward Islam for new guidance; and if at any time temptations overpowered him, or the old habits attracted him, or if he became lax in carrying out the injunctions of Islam, he would become restless with a sense of guilt and would feel the need to purify himself of what had happened, and would turn to the Quran to mold himself according to its guidance. — Sayyid Qutb

In his commentary on verse 5:50 of the Quran, Qutb wrote:

Qutb further wrote: "The foremost duty of Islam in this world is to depose Jahiliyyah from the leadership of man, and to take the leadership into its own hands and enforce the particular way of life which is its permanent feature.

Use of the term for modern Muslim society is usually associated with Qutb's other radical ideas (or Qutbism) -- namely that reappearance of Jahiliyya is a result of the lack of Sharia law, without which Islam cannot exist; that true Islam is a complete system with no room for any element of Jahiliyya; that all aspects of Jahiliyya ("manners, ideas and concepts, rules and regulations, values and criteria") are "evil and corrupt"; that Western and Jewish conspiracies are constantly at work to destroy Islam, etc.

The Islamist group Hizb ut-Tahrir adds the concept of the caliphate to that of shariah law to insist that the Muslim world has been living in jahiliyya since the last caliphate was abolished in 1924 will not be free of it until it is restored.

Jahili poetry

As iconoclastic rationale

Jahiliyya is associated with iconoclasms. In 2015, the ancient history scholar Lucinda Dirven noted that in the destruction of antiquities by the Islamic State terrorist group, the religious rationale also covers for economic and political factors. "Cultural cleansing is a way to claim political power within a certain territory as well as control over history." The assyriologist  Eckart Frahm said,  "Such iconoclasm is not specifically Islamic... What is quite unique in the case of ISIS is that the destruction is directed against images that are thousands of years old, often damaged, and no longer worshipped by anyone, and that there is a concerted effort to use these acts of vandalism as propaganda by broadcasting them through videos."

See also
Arabic poetry
Hanif
Pre-Islamic Arabia
Rahmanism
Stunde Null
Takfir
Year Zero (political notion)

References

Further reading

External links

 

Arabic words and phrases
Islamic terminology
Conversion to Islam
Pre-Islamic Arabia
Ignorance